The Switch is a Canadian drama film, directed by Michel Kandinsky and released in 2022. The film stars François Arnaud as Cpl. Marc Leblanc, a soldier who returns home to Northern Ontario after serving in the War in Afghanistan, only to find his reintegration into civilian life complicated by his struggles with post-traumatic stress disorder.

The cast also includes Lothaire Bluteau, Sophie Desmarais, Joe Pingue, Maxwell McCabe-Lokos and Roch Castonguay.

The film was shot in Sudbury, Ontario, in fall 2020. It had its premiere at the 2022 Cinéfest Sudbury International Film Festival.

References

External links 
 

2022 films
2022 drama films
Canadian drama films
2020s French-language films
Films shot in Greater Sudbury
French-language Canadian films
2020s Canadian films